José María Alvira (18 June 1864 – 31 July 1938) was a Spanish composer, singing teacher, and pianist.

Life and work
Alvira was born in Zaragoza, Aragon. At a young age, he was already showing unusual musical talent, and by eleven he was playing violin for an opera company, for which he wrote Fantasía para violín. His family finances enabled him to study in Paris. In 1880 he was admitted to the Théâtre Lyrique orchestra, where he began studying composition and instrumentation, but also law, in order to please his parents. Although since he was small he showed great liking and aptitudes for the music, he had to follow, by paternal decision, a Law career, which he finished in Madrid in 1885. The growing attraction he felt for art made him abandon those activities to give himself entirely to music, beginning with a trip that he made to Italy, performing as conductor at the Espezzia theater with the opera Lucrezia Borgia (opera). He returned to Madrid, where he studied composition at the Madrid Royal Conservatory with Emilio Arrieta whilst playing in the Teatro de la Zarzuela orchestra. In 1895 he was a director at the Spanish Teatro Real.

In 1896, he was the director of the Concert Academy of the Royal Theater. He also ran the Singing Academy with extraordinary success, not only in the formation of notable Spanish artists, but in the advice of the most famous of foreigners who, taking advantage of his performances in the country, came to the competent direction of Alvira to review their repertoires, strengthen or retrieve abilities or correct deficiencies. Among those who marched past those classrooms and took the advice and lessons of Alvira during the thirty-two years in which he exercised the position. After 1898 he was the director of Orfeon Ecos de Madrid. In the 1900s almost was a broker of Bolsa de Madrid. He also taught singing in Madrid, and he published Cómo aprender a cantar como cantaban los de antes ("How to learn to sing like those singers from the past"), a handbook for singing teachers.

His works in the Royal Theatre of Spain are many: Hansel and Gretel, El oro del Rin, Loreley (1916), Luisa (1919), Mona Lisa (1923), Yolanda (1923), Jardín de oriente, La novia vendida (1924), La virgen de mayo (1925). These activities of the Aragonese teacher not only hinder his work as a composer, as will be seen later in his list of works, but allowed him to undertake a tough business whose realization was his most beloved desire: to widen the scopes and possibilities of the Spanish lyrical scene with the translation and adaptation of famous works. His great knowledge of the demands and difficulties of vocalization, his vast culture and the perfect command of several languages, came together in Alvira for this attempt, to carry it out, and paid off for the excellent versions he made and remained unpublished, of The Barber of Seville, Carmen, Tosca, La traviata, Prince Igor, La Africana, The Master Singers of Nürnberg y Rigoletto.

He married Aurelia Sánchez Bueno in 1909, with whom he had two children. His niece was the well-known actress Carmen Sánchez. His daughter Mary Carmen Alvira was a famous musician in the Spanish international orchestra and she played in the orchestra of the Royal Theatre of Zarzuela for many years.

He died in Madrid aged 74.

Selected works
 Sinfonía en sol
 Miss Hissippi (zarzuela, 1892)
 El suicidio de Pifartes (zarzuela in 1 act, libretto by, premiered 1893 in Madrid)
 Jai Alai (1893)
 El españoleto (1894)
 De la retreta a la Diana (1897)
 Bonito pan de boda (zarzuela in 3 acts, 189)
 Budín, Budón (zarzuela in 3 acts, 189)
 El veterano (zarzuela in 1 acts, 1902)
 La silla de Anea (1904)
 La velada de San Juan (1905)
 Frasco Luis (1905)
 Mar de fondo (1905)
 Calinez o el suicidio de Pifartos (1906)
 Los Campos Elíseos (zarzuela in 3 acts, libretto by, premiered 1906 in Madrid)
 El becerro de oro (1909)
 El alegre manchego (1909)
 El triunfo del amor (extravagancia lírica in 1 act, libretto by, premiered 1913 in Madrid)
 Los sobrinos o Tienda 'Asilo del arte''' (1918)
 El bufón del duque (zarzuela cómica in 1 act, libretto by Emilio, premiered 1923 in Madrid)
 Souvellas Vache Fígaro, el barbero de Sevilla (1923)
 Rigoletto (translator)
 El paraíso de Mahoma La farolada La venta de los vuelos Los hijos del sol Gente de paz El beso de hielo El conde de AlmavivaHonours received
 Amanda Brown was named Amanda Alvira in his honour due to his work with her voice in the 1920s.
 Other voices he showed in the world: In the 1890s, 1900s, 1910s, 1920s included Titta Ruffo, Ángeles Ottein, Giuseppe Anselmi, Ofelia Nieto, José Mardones, Amelita Galli-Curci, Tito Schipa. He also coached Julián Briel, Augusto Ordóñez, Antonio Picatoste, Delfín Pulido, Matilde Pretel, Felicitas Ramírez in their early career.
 When his mother-in-law died, with whom he would rest in the same grave, he inherited all the decorations from his father-in-law the famous military national hero.

References
 Diccionario de la Zarzuela España e Hispanoamérica (2002), several authore (ICCMU); 
 Historia y anécdotario del teatro Real (1997)
 La auténtica vida e historia del teatro (2005), Juan José Videgain
 Historia gráfica de la zarzuela "Los creadores" (ICCMU, 2000) 
 Enciclopèdia Espasa Suplement núm I, dels anys (1935–39), p. 342; 
 Blanco y Negro (Spanish weekly, 1913–1938)
 ABC, El heraldo de Madrid, El país, La correspondencia de España, El globo (1890–1938)
 Nosotros los artistas'' (2017); 

1864 births
1938 deaths
19th-century classical composers
19th-century Spanish male musicians
20th-century classical composers
20th-century conductors (music)
20th-century Spanish male musicians
20th-century Spanish musicians
Composers for piano
Conservatoire de Paris alumni
Madrid Royal Conservatory alumni
Male classical pianists
Male classical violinists
Male conductors (music)
Male opera composers
People from Zaragoza
Jose Maria
Spanish classical composers
Spanish classical pianists
Spanish classical violinists
Spanish conductors (music)
Spanish male classical composers
Spanish opera composers
Spanish Romantic composers